Orthospila is a genus of moths of the family Crambidae. The genus was first described by William Warren in 1890.

Species
Orthospila orissusalis (Walker, 1859)
Orthospila plutusalis (Walker, 1859)

References

Spilomelinae
Crambidae genera
Taxa named by William Warren (entomologist)